Baú River may refer to:

 Baú River (Pará), Brazil
 Baú River (Santa Catarina), Brazil

See also
 Bao River, Shaanxi Province, China